Casamajo is a surname of Catalan-language origin. Notable people with the surname include:

Carles Puigdemont i Casamajó (born 1962), Catalan nationalist politician and journalist
Juan Casamajo (born 1945), Spanish sports shooter

References

Catalan-language surnames